Dyschirius dispar is a species of ground beetle in the subfamily Scaritinae. It was described by Peringuey in 1896.

References

dispar
Beetles described in 1896